Kwon Hyung-jin (born 1964) is a South Korean film director. Kwon debuted with For Horowitz (2006), which won Best New Director at the 44th Grand Bell Awards, including nominations for Best Music, Best Screenplay, Best Editing, Best Sound and Best Actress, and was also nominated for Asia New Talent Award at the 10th Shanghai International Film Festival in 2007.

His second feature is the thriller Truck (2008).

His second thriller Deep Trap (2015) won Best Film Award in the Orient Express section at the Fantasporto in 2016.

Filmography 
MOB 2025 (short film, 2001) - director 
For Horowitz (2006) - director, script editor
Truck (2008) - director
Wedding Dress (2010) - director
Deep Trap (2015) - director, script editor

Awards 
2007 44th Grand Bell Awards: Best New Director (For Horowitz)

References

External links 
 
 
 

1964 births
Living people
South Korean film directors
Dongguk University alumni